How to Be a Conservative is a 2014 book by the English philosopher Roger Scruton, in which the author outlines the conservative ideology, its opposition to economic materialism, and argues how it can be applied to crucial contemporary issues.

Reception
Jesse Norman wrote in The Spectator: "There are occasional missteps and the odd mini-rant, but the book is highly engaging, and studded with insights into topics as diverse as international treaties, alienation and the nature of laughter." In Standpoint, David Willetts wrote that the book "communicates a distinctive conservative disposition with great charm and formidable learning." Willetts wrote that Scruton:

is very good on the importance of autonomous institutions — what I called civic conservatism. But he is surprisingly uninterested in where this great tradition comes from or how it has changed over time. He appears to regard it as a happy and perhaps rather accidental gift from history. This means that his account of the role of Conservatives is rather passive and incurious.

Translations 
A Swedish translation was published in 2016. The book has also been translated into Czech by Jana Ogrocká and published in 2021.

References

External links
 Publicity page

Further reading
 
 
 
 

2014 non-fiction books
Bloomsbury Publishing books
Books about conservatism
Conservative media in the United Kingdom
English non-fiction books
English-language books
Works by Roger Scruton